The bust of Pedro Domingo Murillo is installed in Mexico City's American Park, in Mexico. The sculpture commemorates the bicentennial of the Bolivian revolution.

References

External links

 

Busts in Mexico
Monuments and memorials in Mexico City
Outdoor sculptures in Mexico City
Sculptures of men in Mexico
Polanco, Mexico City